George Dunbar (born 1960) is a Republican member of the Pennsylvania House of Representatives, representing the 56th Legislative District in Westmoreland County. He was first elected in November 2010. In January 2019, he began his 5th term as State Representative.  He serves as the Majority Caucus Chair and serves on the Rules Committee and the Committee on Committees.

Early life 
Dunbar graduated from Taylor Allderdice High School in 1978. He graduated from Robert Morris University with a B.S. in Business Administration in 1993.

Career 
Dunbar served as Executive Vice President of Wright Industries Inc until 2005. He opened and ran his own consulting business from 2005–2007. He then served as controller and Chief Financial Officer for Ryco Inc until his election to the House in 2011.

Dunbar was one of 75 members of the Pennsylvania General Assembly to sign a letter to the state's U.S. congress members on December 4, 2020, regarding an election review for the 2020 presidential election. The letter identifies election-related legal protections its signers believe were undermined, and asks that Congress "reject electoral votes that are  not 'regularly  given' or 'lawfully  certified'", as they are enabled to do by federal law. Dunbar signed another letter to the state's attorney general the same day that requests a review of state policies and procedures during the 2020 presidential election, and seeks related reviews and recommendations.

Committee assignments 

 Committee on Committees
 Rules

References

External links
George Dunbar (R) official PA House website
State Representative George Dunbar official caucus website
George Dunbar for State Representative official campaign website

Living people
Republican Party members of the Pennsylvania House of Representatives
Robert Morris University alumni
1960 births
21st-century American politicians